Mount Carmer is a mountain on the east side of Wotkyns Glacier in Antarctica, standing  west-northwest of Heathcock Peak in the Caloplaca Hills. It was mapped by the United States Geological Survey from surveys and from U.S. Navy air photos, 1960–64, and named by the Advisory Committee on Antarctic Names for John L. Carmer, electronics technician at Byrd Station in 1962.

References 

Mountains of Marie Byrd Land